Mihailo Dinić (23 April 1899 – 12 May 1970) was a Serbian historian and member of the Serbian Academy of Science and Arts. He was among the key figures of the Serbian historiography of the 20th century.

He was among many notable scholars in Serbia who bequeathed their personal libraries to the National Library of Serbia.

Bibliography 
 "Стефан Драгутин „гех Serviae"" [Stephen Dragutin "rex Serviae"], Glasnik IDNS 4, 1931, 436-437 
 "Dubrovacka srednjevekovna karavanska trgovina" Jugoslovenski Istoriski Casopis 3 (1937)
 
 
 "Два савременика о боју на Косову" [Two contemporaries about the Battle of Kosovo], Glas, Serbian Royal Academy, CLXXXII, 1940
 "Jedan prilog za istoriju patarena u Bosni" - Zbornik Filozofskog fakulteta, I, Belgrade 1948
 
 
 "Област краља Драгутина после Дежева" [King Dragutin's territory after Deževo], Glas 203, 1951, 61-82
 
 
 
 "Humsko-Trebinjska vlastela" Beograd, 1967, 114 p., Naucno delo, S.A.N. Posebna izdanja 
 "Španski najamnici u srpskoj službi" Zbornik Radova Vizantološkog Instituta, VI, Belgrade, 1960, str. 15-28
 "Odnos između kralja Milutina i Dragutina" Zbornik Radova Vizantološkog Instituta, br. 3, str. 49-82 (1955)
 "Nastanak dva naša srednjovekovna grada", Prilozi, XXXI, sveska 3-4, Belgrade 1965

References

External links 
 Biography on the website of SANU
 Nova Zbirka Radova Mihaila Dinića — Teme, XXX, Br. 1, pp: 167—171

1899 births
1970 deaths
Writers from Požarevac
20th-century Serbian historians
Members of the Serbian Academy of Sciences and Arts
Academic staff of the University of Belgrade
University of Belgrade Faculty of Philosophy alumni